The Way of the Scorpion is a 1999 role-playing game supplement for Legend of the Five Rings Roleplaying Game published by Alderac Entertainment Group.

Contents
The Way of the Scorpion is a supplement in which the Scorpion Clan is detailed.

Reception
The Way of the Scorpion was reviewed in the online second version of Pyramid which said "The first chapter, the Subtle Scorpion, starts off with tales that describe the Scorpion's presence in Rokugan, as well as a brief history detailing why the Scorpion Clan behaves as it does. The stories are short enough that they don't distract, and the history makes the Scorpion seem noble in their efforts to do the dirty work of the Emperor.."

Reviews
Backstab #15

References

Legend of the Five Rings Roleplaying Game
Role-playing game books
Role-playing game supplements introduced in 1999